This is a list of video games from the anime series Bakugan Battle Brawlers.

Bakugan Battle Brawlers (2009)
Bakugan Battle Brawlers is a video game based on the original anime series made by NOW Production and Activision for the PlayStation 2, Nintendo DS and Wii, PlayStation 3 and Xbox 360. The game was released in September 2009.

Bakugan Battle Brawlers: Battle Trainer (2010)

Bakugan Battle Brawlers: Battle Trainer is the second Bakugan video game for the Nintendo DS. It has a few minigames. There are 30 Bakugan, like the last game, and it will also have hidden Bakugan. A mistake is that in the game, the player's "Ultimate Dragonoid" in sphere mode is actually a Pyrus Naga.

Storyline
One month ago, a spaceship called the Dark Star has abducted most of the Earth's Bakugan. To make matters worse, in a test of teleportation technology to get to the Dark Star, Dan has forgotten all of that! In order to rescue the captive Bakugan, Dan will have to train himself and his Bakugan in order to beat the kidnappers, who call themselves the Regulars.

Near the finale, the Brawlers discovered that Professor Trecov is Vector, and he stole all Bakugan from Earth with his pals Aurock, Viper and Mantis. Vector reveals his plan to take the Silent Core and create the ultimate Bakugan. After the final battle, he escaped while claiming revenge on Dan.

In the game's ending, Masquerade appears angered because of the Regulars' failure, revealing that they were working for Naga and the Doom Beings. Masquerade claimed to take down the Brawlers himself.

The game takes place between Bakugan Battle Brawlers episodes 37 and 38.

Reception

Battle Trainer received "generally unfavorable reviews" according to Metacritic.

Bakugan Dimensions (2010)

Bakugan: Dimensions was a web-based MMO (Massively Multi-player Online) game developed by Flying Lab Software. It allowed players to brawl online. To get Bakugan, the player had to use the DNA codes found on Gundalian Invaders Bakugan.

Background
Bakugan: Dimensions was a free online world where people from all around the world could battle, collect Bakugan, and battle with other gamers. It resembled Marucho's Bakugan Interspace. It was only available for users from the U.S., Canada, and Australia. It closed down on June 30, 2011 for unknown reasons.

Bakugan Battle Brawlers: Arcade Battler (2010)
An arcade game only available in Japan. Players can use their cards in the packs, which is very similar to the first video game. It is based on the second season.

Bakugan: Defenders of the Core (2010)

Bakugan: Defenders of the Core is a multi-console game, released in 2010. Despite its title, it is based on Bakugan: New Vestroia. It was released for the DS, Wii, PSP, PS3 and Xbox 360.

Bakugan: Rise of the Resistance (2011)

Plot
A mysterious new group of vexios are invading New Vestroia. It's up to you to defend against these unknown new foes in their attempt to create the most powerful Bakugan ever! Travel through different lands of New Vestroia and control your personal Bakugan on the battlefield. You must become the greatest general of all in order to free the Vexios and save New Vestroia from evil forces.

Bakugan: Champions of Vestroia (2020)

Bakugan: Champions of Vestroia was revealed in 2020, and, like Battle Trainer, was given negative reviews, albeit both when it was revealed and when it was released. It is the first Bakugan video game made by Warner Bros. Interactive Entertainment and developed by WayForward, which isn't refenced in the trailer, but rather in the in-game credits and this link. It is also the latter's second title to be exclusive to Nintendo Switch after Vitamin Connection.

Notes and references

External links
 Bakugan World
 Bakugan Battle Brawlers
 Bakugan Games 

Lists of video games by franchise
Bakugan